The 23rd Alberta Legislative Assembly was in session from August 30, 1993, to February 11, 1997, with the membership of the assembly determined by the results of the 1993 Alberta general election held on June 15, 1993. The Legislature officially resumed on August 30, 1993, and continued until the fifth session was prorogued and dissolved on February 11, 1997, prior to the 1997 Alberta general election on March 11, 1997.

Alberta's twenty-second government was controlled by the majority Progressive Conservative Association of Alberta, led by Premier Ralph Klein. The Official Opposition was led by Laurence Decore of the Liberal Party, and later Grant Mitchell.  The Speaker was Stanley Schumacher.

Bills

Freedom of Information and Protection of Privacy Act

The Freedom of Information and Protection of Privacy Act (FOIP Act) is the freedom of information and privacy act for Alberta, Canada. It was passed by the Alberta Legislature in June 1994 and came into force on October 1, 1995.

Civil Enforcement Act

The Civil Enforcement Act, S.A. 1994, c.C-10.5, is a law in Alberta, Canada. The law gave responsibility for seizures, evictions, repossessions, and enforcing court orders to authorized civil enforcement agencies. Sheriffs' Offices throughout the province closed, but The Office of the Sheriff - Civil Enforcement was created under the Court Services Division of Alberta Justice to monitor the civil enforcement agency activities and respond to complaints. The Act was proclaimed in force on January 1, 1996.

Electric Utilities Act

The Electric Utilities Act (1996) effective January 1, 1996, which created Power Pool of Alberta, a wholesale market clearing entity. The Power Pool was a not for profit entity that operated the "competitive wholesale market including dispatch of generation." The Electric Utilities Act stipulated all electric energy bought and sold in Alberta had to be exchanged through the Power Pool which "served as an independent, central, open access pool." It functioned as a "spot market intending to match the demand with the lowest cost supply and establish an hourly pool price." 
Alberta was the first Canadian province to implement a deregulated electricity market. Competitive wholesale markets were being fostered in the 1990s as part of the liberalization process of the 1990s changing some parameters such as the unbundling of generation, transmission and distribution functions of incumbent utilities. Local distribution utilities, either investor- or municipally owned, retained the obligation to supply and the 6 largest utilities were assigned a share of the output of existing generators at a fixed price.

Party standings after the 23rd General Election

Standing changes
Paul Langevin, MLA for Lac La Biche-St. Paul, crosses the floor from the Liberals to the Progressive Conservatives in 1995.

Members elected
For complete electoral history, see individual districts

Note:
1 Pat Black later changed her last name to Nelson.

References

Further reading

External links
Alberta Legislative Assembly
Legislative Assembly of Alberta Members Book
By-elections 1905 to present

23